Conodurine is an acetylcholinesterase inhibitor and butyrylcholinesterase inhibitor isolated from Tabernaemontana.

See also 
Conolidine
Confoline

References

Acetylcholinesterase inhibitors
Alkaloids found in Apocynaceae
Indole alkaloids
Tertiary amines